Promalactis uncinispinea is a moth of the family Oecophoridae. It is found in Sichuan, China.

The wingspan is about 11 mm. The basal three-fifths of the forewings are ochreous brown and the distal two-fifths are ochreous yellow. The markings are silvery white or white, edged with dense black
scales. The hindwings and cilia are dark grey.

Etymology
The specific name is derived from the Latin prefix uncin- (meaning hooked) and Latin spineus (meaning spine-like) and refers to the hooked distal spine in the aedeagus.

References

Moths described in 2013
Oecophorinae
Insects of China